Cinaciguat (BAY 58-2667) is an experimental drug for the treatment of acute decompensated heart failure.

Mechanism of action
Cinaciguat activates the soluble guanylate cyclase (sGC) which is a receptor for nitric oxide. This increases biosynthesis of cyclic GMP, resulting in vasodilation.

See also
Riociguat, another drug stimulating sGC, but with a different mechanism
 PDE5 inhibitors act further downstream in the nitric oxide signalling pathway, reducing cyclic GMP degradation.

References 

Vasodilators
Benzoic acids
Phenol ethers